Xan de Waard (born 8 November 1995) is a Dutch field hockey player.

De Waard has played 150 international matches for the Netherlands women's national field hockey team. She was a member of the Dutch team that won the 2014 Women's Hockey World Cup.
De Waard was a member of the Netherlands team that won a silver medal at the 2016 Summer Olympics.

References

External links
 

1995 births
Living people
Dutch female field hockey players
People from Renkum
Sportspeople from Gelderland
Medalists at the 2016 Summer Olympics
Olympic silver medalists for the Netherlands
Olympic medalists in field hockey
Field hockey players at the 2016 Summer Olympics
Field hockey players at the 2020 Summer Olympics
Olympic field hockey players of the Netherlands
Female field hockey midfielders
Olympic gold medalists for the Netherlands
Medalists at the 2020 Summer Olympics
SCHC players
20th-century Dutch women
21st-century Dutch women